The yellow-breasted brushfinch (Atlapetes latinuchus), also known as the cloud-forest brushfinch, is a species of bird in the family Passerellidae. It is sometimes considered a subspecies of Atlapetes rufinucha.

It is found in forest and woodland in the Andean highlands of northern Peru, through Ecuador and Colombia, to far western Venezuela. It is generally common, and therefore considered to be of least concern by BirdLife International. A new subspecies, A. l. yariguierum, was described in 2006 from Serranía de los Yariguíes in Colombia.

Gallery

See also
Bolivian brushfinch or rufous-naped brushfinch  (Atlapetes rufinucha)

References

yellow-breasted brush finch
Birds of the Northern Andes
yellow-breasted brush finch
yellow-breasted brush finch